This is a list of burn centres in the United Kingdom. A burn centre or burn care facility is typically a hospital ward which specializes in the treatment of severe burn injuries. In British Overseas Territories, patients requiring specialist care, including severe burns, are often referred to hospitals in other nearby countries.

England and Wales

London and South East England 
The London and South East England Burn Network serves burn victims in London, the East of England, Kent, Surrey, Sussex, Thames Valley, and Wessex. It has four hospitals servicing around 21 million people.
 Broomfield Hospital, Chelmsford
 Chelsea & Westminster Hospital, London
 Queen Victoria Hospital, East Grinstead
 Stoke Mandeville Hospital, Aylesbury

Midlands 
The Midlands Burn Care Network serves burn victims across the Midlands, providing care for approximately 13.7 million people.
 Queen Elizabeth Hospital, Birmingham
 Birmingham Children's Hospital 
 Nottingham University Hospitals 
 Leicester Royal Infirmary
 Royal Stoke University Hospital

South West 
The SWUK Burn Care Network services approximately 10 million people in south west England and the south, mid and west of Wales.
 Southmead Hospital, Bristol
 Morriston Hospital, Swansea
 Salisbury District Hospital, Salisbury

North 
The Northern Burn Care Network provides burn care for the population covered by the North of England (including the North East, North West, and Yorkshire and the Humber), North Wales and the Isle of Man.
 The Royal Victoria Infirmary, Newcastle
 Whiston Hospital
 Northern General Hospital, Sheffield 
 Pinderfields Hospital
 Wythenshawe Hospital
 Royal Preston Hospital
 Royal Manchester Children's Hospital

Wales 

Morriston Hospital, Swansea.

Scotland 
NHS Scotland has its own network of burn centres.
 Royal Aberdeen Hospital for Sick Children
 St John's Hospital, Livingston
 Glasgow Royal Hospital for Children
 Aberdeen Royal Infirmary
 Glasgow Royal Infirmary
 Royal Hospital for Sick Children, Edinburgh
 Ninewells Hospital, Dundee

Northern Ireland 
The Northern Ireland Regional Burn Care provides burn care for all of Northern Ireland.
 Royal Victoria Hospital, Belfast

References 

Burns
Healthcare in the United Kingdom
Burn